Kurów  is a village in the administrative district of Gmina Stryszawa, within Sucha County, Lesser Poland Voivodeship, in southern Poland.

The village has a population of 700.

References

Villages in Sucha County